This is a list of hospitals in North Carolina. Four hospitals serve as university-affiliated academic medical centers: Duke University Hospital, ECU Health, UNC Health and Atrium Health Wake Forest Baptist, while Atrium Health's Carolinas Medical Center and WakeMed are unaffiliated Level I trauma centers.

Hospital List

Closed hospitals

Other hospitals 

There are several Long term acute care hospitals and inpatient rehab facilities in the state of North Carolina.

The North Carolina Department of Health and Human Services administers 3 psychiatric hospitals in North Carolina:

The United States Department of Defense armed forces operate three hospitals in North Carolina:

The United States Department of Veterans Affairs operates four hospitals in North Carolina:

References

External links 
Hospitals licensed by the State of North Carolina

North Carolina

Hospitals